Kalibr Instrument Plant is a company based in Moscow, Russia.

The Moscow Kalibr Instrument Plant produces universal and specialized calibrating instruments for use by industrial plants and defense facilities, and has produced ordnance measuring devices for missile artillery organizations. The Kalibr plant is attempting to develop markets for its products in developing countries.

References

External links
 Official website

Manufacturing companies based in Moscow
Ministry of the Machine Tool and Tool Industry (Soviet Union)
Manufacturing companies of the Soviet Union
Russian brands